Soluk Bon or Solukbon may refer to:
 Soluk Bon-e Olya
 Soluk Bon-e Sofla
 Soluk Bon-e Vosta